Theodoxus subthermalis is a species of a freshwater snail with an operculum, an aquatic gastropod mollusk in the family Neritidae, the nerites.

Taxonomy
This taxon was originally described as Theodoxus fluviatilis var. subthermalis.

Distribution
This species occurs in:
 Georgia
 South European Russia

References

Neritidae
Gastropods described in 1865